Emma Laine and Irena Pavlovic were the defending champions, but both decided not to participate.

Naomi Broady and Kristina Mladenovic won the title defeating Karolína Plíšková and Kristýna Plíšková in the final 5–7, 6–4, [10–2].

Seeds

Draw

References
 Main draw

Slovak Open - Doubles
2011 Women's Doubles